Ann Lambert (born 1957) is a Montreal-based Canadian playwright and author. Her plays include Force of Circumstance, Parallel Lines and Very Heaven. Her debut novel, The Birds That Stay, was published in 2019. She also teaches at Dawson College.

Early life 
Lambert was born in 1957 and was raised in West Island, Quebec.

Career 
In 2019, Lambert along with Danielle Szydlowski, Laura Mitchell, and Lambert's daughter, Alice Abracen, founded the intergenerational women's collective, Théâtre Ouest End.

Lambert's first novel, a murder-mystery titled The Birds That Stay, was published in 2019 by Second Story Press. She released its sequel, The Dogs of Winter, in 2020.

Lambert teaches English at Dawson College in Montreal.

Works

Plays 

 The Wall
Force of Circumstance
 Parallel Lines
 The Pilgrimage
 Self Offense
 Very Heaven
 The Assumption of Empire

Novels 

 The Birds That Stay (2019)
 The Dogs of Winter (2020)

Personal life 
Lambert is married to David Abracen, with whom she lives in Montreal. They have two children: a daughter, Alice, and a son, Isaac.

External links
The Canadian Theatre Encyclopedia
The Playwrights Database

References

1957 births
Canadian women dramatists and playwrights
Writers from Montreal
Living people
Academic staff of Dawson College
20th-century Canadian dramatists and playwrights
21st-century Canadian dramatists and playwrights
20th-century Canadian women writers
21st-century Canadian women writers